

Alplersee is a lake on the slopes of the Rophaien mountain near Riemenstalden and Sisikon in the Canton of Uri, Switzerland.

There is another lake in the canton of Uri with the same name near Unterschächen.

External links
Alplersee (Riemenstalden)

Lakes of Switzerland
Lakes of the canton of Uri